Suggestion is the psychological process by which a person guides their own or another person's desired thoughts, feelings, and behaviors by presenting stimuli that may elicit them as reflexes instead of relying on conscious effort.

Nineteenth-century writers on psychology such as William James used the words "suggest" and "suggestion" in the context of a particular idea which was said to suggest another when it brought that other idea to mind. Early scientific studies of hypnosis by Clark Leonard Hull and others extended the meaning of these words in a special and technical sense (Hull, 1933).

The original neuropsychological theory of hypnotic suggestion was based upon the ideomotor reflex response that William B. Carpenter declared, in 1852, was the principle through which James Braid's hypnotic phenomena were produced.

Émile Coué 
Émile Coué (1857–1926) was a significant pioneer in the development of an understanding of the application of therapeutic suggestion; and, according to Cheek and LeCron, most of our current knowledge of suggestion "stems from Coué" (1968, p.60). With the intention of "saturating the cognitive microenvironment of the mind", Coué's therapeutic method approach was based on four non-controversial principles:
 suggestion can produce somatic phenomena;
 specific suggestions generate specific somatic outcomes;
 suggestions are just as efficacious in the treatment of physical or organic conditions as they are for functional or emotional conditions; and
 a successful suggestion-based intervention for a physical condition does not indicate that the original complaint was in any way imaginary. 

Coué's laws of suggestion. Ideomotor and ideosensory effect.  (Suggestion and Autosuggestion, Baudouin, C. 1920: 117).
1. The Law of Concentrated AttentionIf spontaneous attention is concentrated on an idea, this tends to become realized.
2. The Law of Auxiliary Emotion, also called the Law of dominant effect When a suggestion is supported by emotion it will become stronger than every other suggestion, given at the same moment.
3. The Law of Reversed Effort If conscious will is in conflict with fantasy, the fantasy will win.
4. The Law of Subconscious Teleology When the goal has been traced out the unconscious will find out how to reach it. To be realized an idea must be unconsciously processed and accepted. The mechanism is the same as in motivation.

Hypnosis

Trance and suggestion
Modern scientific study of hypnosis, which follows the pattern of Hull's work, separates two essential factors: "trance" and suggestion. The state of mind induced by "trance" is said to come about via the process of a hypnotic induction—essentially instructing and suggesting to the subject that they will enter a hypnotic state. Once a subject enters hypnosis, the hypnotist gives suggestions that can produce sought effects. Commonly used suggestions on measures of "suggestibility" or "susceptibility" (or for those with a different theoretical orientation, "hypnotic talent") include suggestions that one's arm is getting lighter and floating up in the air, or that a fly is buzzing around one's head. The "classic" response to an accepted suggestion that one's arm is beginning to float in the air is that the subject perceives the intended effect as happening involuntarily.

Scientific hypnotism
Consistent with the views of Pierre Janet—who noted (1920, pp.284–285) that the critical feature is not the making of a 'suggestion', but, instead, is the taking of the 'suggestion'—Weitzenhoffer (2000, passim), argued that scientific hypnotism centres on the delivery of "suggestions" to hypnotized subjects; and, according to Yeates (2016b, p.35), these suggestions are delivered with the intention of eliciting:
 the further stimulation of partially active mental states and/or physiological processes;
 the awakening of dormant mental states and/or physiological processes;
 the activation of latent mental states and/or physiological processes;
 alterations in existing perceptions, thoughts, feelings, and/or behaviours; and/or
 entirely new perceptions, thoughts, feelings, and/or behaviours.

Temporal dimensions
Furthermore, according to Yeates (2016b, pp.35–36), 'suggestions' have four temporal dimensions: 
 pre-hypnotic suggestions, delivered prior to the formal induction;
 suggestions for within-hypnotic influence, to elicit specific within-session outcomes;
 suggestions for post-hypnotic influence, to elicit specific post-session outcomes:
 immediate influence ("and, on leaving here today, you'll…");
 shorter-term influence ("and, each time you're…");
 longer-term influence ("and, as time passes, you'll increasingly…"); or
 specific-moment influence (Bernheim's suggestions à longue échéance, 'suggestions to be realised after a long interval'), which are (i) intended "to produce a particular effect at a designated later hour", (ii) have "no influence before the appointed hour", (iii) nor "after it had expired" (Barrows, 1896, pp.22–23), or
 post-hypnotic suggestions, delivered to dehypnotised-but-not-yet-completely-reoriented subjects.

Waking suggestion
Suggestions, however, can also have an effect in the absence of a hypnosis. These so-called "waking suggestions" are given in precisely the same way as "hypnotic suggestions" (i.e., suggestions given within hypnosis) and can produce strong changes in perceptual experience. Experiments on suggestion, in the absence of hypnosis, were conducted by early researchers such as Hull (1933). More recently, researchers such as Nicholas Spanos and Irving Kirsch have conducted experiments investigating such non-hypnotic-suggestibility and found a strong correlation between people's responses to suggestion both in- and outside hypnosis.

Other forms
In addition to the kinds of suggestion typically delivered by researchers interested in hypnosis there are other forms of suggestibility, though not all are considered interrelated. These include: primary and secondary suggestibility (older terms for non-hypnotic and hypnotic suggestibility respectively), hypnotic suggestibility (i.e., the response to suggestion measured within hypnosis), and interrogative suggestibility (yielding to interrogative questions, and shifting responses when interrogative pressure is applied: see Gudjonsson suggestibility scale. Metaphors and imagery can also be used to deliver suggestion.

See also 

Affirmations
Attitude
Autosuggestion
Autogenic training
Crowd manipulation
Echopraxia
Hypnotic susceptibility
Nancy School
Neuro-linguistic programming
Posthypnotic amnesia
Psychosomatic medicine
The Salpêtrière School of Hypnosis
Self-hypnosis
Subconscious
Suggestibility

Footnotes

References
 Barrows, C.M., "Suggestion Without Hypnotism: An Account of Experiments in Preventing or Suppressing Pain", Proceedings of the Society for Psychical Research, vol.12, No.30, (1896), pp.21–44.
  V. M. Bekhterev "Suggestion and its Role in Social Life" with a Preface by José Manuel Jara Italian edition, Psichiatria e Territorio, 2013.
 Cheek, D.B., & LeCron, L.M., Clinical Hypnotherapy, Grune & Stratton (New York), 1968.
 Janet, P., "Lecture XIII: The Hysterical Stigmata—Suggestibility", pp.270–292 in P. Janet, The Major Symptoms of Hysteria: Fifteen Lectures Given in the Medical School of Harvard University, Second Edition with New Matter, Macmillan Company, (New York), 1920.
 
 Weitzenhoffer, A.M., The Practice of Hypnotism (Second Edition), John Wiley & Sons (New York), 2000.
 Yeates, L.B., James Braid: Surgeon, Gentleman Scientist, and Hypnotist, Ph.D. Dissertation, School of History and Philosophy of Science, Faculty of Arts & Social Sciences, University of New South Wales, January 2013.
 Yeates, Lindsay B. (2016a), "Émile Coué and his Method (I): The Chemist of Thought and Human Action", Australian Journal of Clinical Hypnotherapy & Hypnosis, Volume 38, No.1, (Autumn 2016), pp.3–27.
 Yeates, Lindsay B. (2016b), "Émile Coué and his Method (II): Hypnotism, Suggestion, Ego-Strengthening, and Autosuggestion", Australian Journal of Clinical Hypnotherapy & Hypnosis, Volume 38, No.1, (Autumn 2016), pp.28–54.
 Yeates, Lindsay B. (2016c), "Émile Coué and his Method (III): Every Day in Every Way", Australian Journal of Clinical Hypnotherapy & Hypnosis, Volume 38, No.1, (Autumn 2016), pp.55–79.

External links

 , Chautauqua Institution
 The Power of Suggestion: What We Expect Influences Our Behavior, for Better or Worse
 Exploring the science behind hypnosis

Hypnosis
Sentences by type